Lieutenant Colonel John Henry Guy Nevill, 5th Marquess of Abergavenny,  (8 November 1914 – 23 February 2000) was a British peer.

Biography
The eldest son of the 4th Marquess of Abergavenny, Lord Abergavenny was educated at Eton and Trinity College, Cambridge.

In 1936, he became an officer in the service of the Life Guards and fought in the Second World War, was invested as an Officer of the Order of the British Empire in 1945, and rose to the rank of Lieutenant-Colonel in 1946.

On 4 January 1938, he married (Mary) Patricia Harrison, by whom he had five children:
 Lady Anne Patricia Nevill (b. 25 October 1938), married Captain Martin Whiteley and had issue.
 Lady Vivienne Margaret Nevill (15 February 1941 – 10 September 2018), married Alan Lillingston and had issue.
 Lady Jane Elizabeth Nevill (1944–1946), died in infancy.
 Henry John Montague Nevill, Earl of Lewes (1948–1965), educated at Eton, died without issue.
 Lady Rose Nevill (b. 15 July 1950); a bridesmaid at the wedding of Princess Margaret and Antony Armstrong-Jones. Lady Rose married George Clowes and had issue.

Lord Abergavenny was an Honorary Colonel of the Kent Yeomanry 1949–1961, and of the Kent and County of London Yeomanry (Sharpshooters) 1961–1962. He was a member of East Sussex County Council between 1947 and 1954 and County Alderman for East Sussex between 1954 and 1962. He was also Deputy Lieutenant of Sussex in 1955, Vice-Lieutenant of Sussex between 1970 and 1974 and later the first Lord Lieutenant of East Sussex from 1974 to 1989.

Aside from his army and political career, Lord Abergavenny was also a Director of Massey Ferguson between 1955 and 1985; a Director of Lloyds Bank between 1962 and 1985; Chairman of Lloyds Bank South-East Regional Board between 1962 and 1985; and a Director of Whitbread Investment.

Lord Abergavenny became a Knight of St John in 1976, a Knight of the Garter in 1974, and was Chancellor of that Order between 1977 and 1994. In 1986, he was awarded an honorary Doctorate of Laws from the University of Sussex.

Abergavenny was also involved in horse racing. He rode in steeplechases between 1935 and 1939, and was elected to the National Hunt Committee in 1942, acting as a steward from 1948 to 1950, 1952–54 and 1960–62. He became a member of the Jockey Club in 1950 and vice-chairman of the Turf Board in 1967. He was also a director of both Cheltenham and Fontwell Racecourses. He served as a Trustee to the Ascot Authority in 1952 and became the Queen's representative at Ascot. His racing colours were scarlet with white cross-belts.

Death
Lord Abergavenny died in 2000, aged 85. As he had no surviving male children, he was succeeded by his nephew, Christopher Nevill, 6th Marquess of Abergavenny.

Notes

References

External links
 
 

1914 births
2000 deaths
05
People educated at Eton College
Alumni of Trinity College, Cambridge
British Army personnel of World War II
Chancellors of the Order of the Garter
Knights of the Garter
Knights of the Order of St John
Officers of the Order of the British Empire
Members of East Sussex County Council
Deputy Lieutenants of Sussex
John
Lord-Lieutenants of East Sussex
British Life Guards officers
20th-century British landowners
Abergavenny